The Swoveberg (Swovenberg, from , "Swabia Mountain") is a low mountain in Northampton County, Pennsylvania. Hellertown Reservoir adjoins the mountain to the south. 

It is a part of the Reading Prong of the Appalachian Mountains.

References 

Mountains of Northampton County, Pennsylvania
Mountains of Pennsylvania